Tom Okker and Marty Riessen were the defending champions, but Riessen did not participate this year.  Okker partnered Arthur Ashe, losing in the quarterfinals.

Bob Hewitt and Frew McMillan won the doubles title at the 1975 Stockholm Open tennis tournament, defeating Charlie Pasarell and Roscoe Tanner 3–6, 6–3, 6–4 in the final.

Seeds

Draw

Finals

Top half

Bottom half

References
Draw

Stockholm Open
1975 Grand Prix (tennis)